Vunakanau Airfield was an aerodrome located near Vunakanau, East New Britain, Papua New Guinea. The airfield was constructed as a Royal Australian Air Force aerodrome and consisted of an unpaved single runway during World War II. The airfield was captured during the battle of Rabaul in 1942 by the Imperial Japanese and was extensively modified and expanded. Vunakanau was later neutralized by Allied air bombing from 1944.

The airfield was utilised as an emergency landing strip for Rabaul (former airport) until 1983, however it was no longer needed when the new Rabaul Airport was built at Tokua. The runways are now overgrown.

Allied Units based at Vunakanau Airfield
No. 24 Squadron RAAF, CAC Wirraway and Lockheed Hudson

Japanese Units based at Vunakanau Airfield
4th Kōkūtai (4th "Air Group", G4M1 Rikko)
Misawa Kōkūtai (G4M1)
705 Kōkūtai (G4M1)
702 Kōkūtai (G4M1)
751 Kōkūtai (G4M1)
Tainan Kōkūtai (A6M Zero) 
251 Kōkūtai (A6M Zero & J1N1 Gekkou)
1st Sentai (Ki-43 Oscar)
11th Sentai (Ki-43 Oscar) 
13th Sentai (Ki-45 Nick)
68th Sentai (Ki-61 Tony)
78th Sentai (Ki-61 Tony)

References

External links
http://www.pacificwrecks.com/airfields/png/vunakanau/index.html

Transport in Papua New Guinea
Airports in Papua New Guinea
East New Britain Province